Sun Guoqiang (born 30 May 1974 in Zhengzhou, Henan, China) is a Chinese baseball player who was a member of Team China at the 2008 Summer Olympics.

Major performances
1997 National Games - 4th

References
Profile 2008 Olympics Team China
CBL Official site

1974 births
Living people
Baseball players at the 2008 Summer Olympics
2009 World Baseball Classic players
Olympic baseball players of China
Chinese baseball players
People from Zhengzhou
Sportspeople from Henan